Erovete is a village in Kirkovo Municipality, Kardzhali Province, southern Bulgaria.

Honours
Erovete Peak on Loubet Coast, Antarctica is named after the village.

References

Villages in Kardzhali Province